This is a list of electoral results for the Electoral district of Williamstown in Victorian state elections.

Members for Williamstown

Election results

Elections in the 2020s

Elections in the 2010s

Elections in the 2000s

Elections in the 1990s

Elections in the 1980s

Elections in the 1970s

Elections in the 1960s

The two candidate preferred vote was not counted between the Labor and DLP candidates for Williamstown.

 The two candidate preferred vote was not counted between the Labor and DLP candidates for Williamstown.

Elections in the 1950s

Elections in the 1940s

 Preferences were not distributed.

 Preferences were not distributed.

Elections in the 1930s

 Preferences were not distributed.

Elections in the 1920s

Elections in the 1910s

References

 

Victoria (Australia) state electoral results by district